Brian Mahoney (born 12 May 1952) is an English former professional footballer who played for Huddersfield Town and Barnsley. He was quite a stout gentleman, somewhat in the mold of Franny Lee.

References

1952 births
Living people
English footballers
People from Tantobie
Footballers from County Durham
Association football midfielders
English Football League players
Huddersfield Town A.F.C. players
Barnsley F.C. players